Peter Messerli was Vice-President of the European Patent Office (EPO) and head of the Boards of Appeal of the EPO known as DG3 (Directorate-General, 3, Appeals) from 1996 until his retirement at the end of November 2011.

He was head of the Patent Division at the Swiss Federal Institute for Intellectual Property before joining the EPO.

Publications 
 Peter Messerli, Resolving the conflict between discovery in American courts and the protection of secrecy under the laws of Switzerland, May 1, 1985,

References

Further reading 
 Managing IP honours Peter Messerli, EPO web site, 7 April 2011. Consulted on April 22, 2011.
 

Living people
Year of birth missing (living people)